Kim Nousiainen (born 14 November 2000) is a Finnish professional ice hockey defenceman currently playing for the Ontario Reign of the American Hockey League (AHL) as a prospect to the Los Angeles Kings of the National Hockey League (NHL).

Playing career
Nousiainen made his Liiga debut for KalPa during the 2018–19 season, playing six regular season games. He was drafted 119th overall by the Los Angeles Kings in the 2019 NHL Entry Draft.

In his third full season with KalPa in 2021–22, Nousiainen was named an alternate captain and posted 4 goals and 14 points in 35 games. On 28 March 2022, Nousiainen left KalPa and moved to North America, joining the Kings organization in signing an amateur tryout contract with primary AHL affiliate, the Ontario Reign, for the remainder of the season. Nousiainen was then promptly signed to a three-year, entry-level contract with the Kings commencing in the  season, on 31 March 2022.

Career statistics

Regular season and playoffs

International

References

External links

2000 births
Living people
Finnish ice hockey defencemen
Iisalmen Peli-Karhut players
KalPa players
People from Kuopio
Los Angeles Kings draft picks
Ontario Reign (AHL) players
Sportspeople from North Savo